The R557 is a Regional Route in South Africa.

Route
Its western terminus is the R553 in Ennerdale. The road heads east, to the R82. It is co-signed for two kilometres heading north, then continues east-south-east to cross the R59 highway at Daleside. It then heads more south-east, alongside the Suikerbosrand Nature Reserve, crossing the R551 to end at the R42 between Vereeniging and Heidelberg.

References

Regional Routes in Gauteng